SERRV International is an American 501(c)(3) nonprofit alternative trading organization, operating in the United States, Africa, Asia and Latin America. It began operations in Europe in 1949, and now operates in 24 countries around the world. In 2005 it had annual sales of over $8.5 million.

It is a member of the Fair Trade Federation and follows its fair-trade principles of transparency and prompt payment; development of opportunity, capacity and safety in the workplace; and respect for cultural identity, the environment and the rights of children.

History 

Sales Exchange for Refugee Rehabilitation and Vocation was established in 1949 to help refugees in Europe recover economically and socially in the aftermath of World War II. The acronym SERRV was later changed to stand for "Sustainable Employment, Resources, Rights and Vision".

References

Alternative trading organizations
Anabaptism in Maryland
New Windsor, Maryland
Charities based in Maryland
Organizations established in 1949
Fair trade organizations
Church of the Brethren
1949 establishments in Maryland